Laptev Strait (Miiterey Laptev silbehiite) is a 60 km-wide strait in Russia. It separates Great Lyakhovsky Island of the Lyakhovsky Islands from the mainland, and connects the Laptev Sea in the west with the East Siberian Sea in the east.  It is named after Russian explorer Dmitry Laptev.

References

Straits of the Laptev Sea
Straits of the East Siberian Sea
Bodies of water of the Sakha Republic
New Siberian Islands
Straits of Russia